Gerard Monaco is a British actor who trained at the Royal Academy of Dramatic Art.

Monaco's first film was Mike Leigh’s Vera Drake. He has since had roles in movies including Dame Jane Campion's Bright Star Jerry Bruckheimer's Pirates of the Caribbean: On Stranger Tides (directed by Rob Marshall), and Starter for Ten.

Monaco's theatre career includes Lindsay Posner’s 2009 revival of Arthur Miller’s A View From the Bridge, in which Monaco made his West End debut playing Marco, opposite Mary Elizabeth Mastrantonio, Ken Stott and Hayley Atwell.

He has appeared in a number of plays at London's National Theatre, including Steven Pimlott's final production, Tennessee Williams's The Rose Tattoo starring Zoë Wanamaker (Pimlott died in the second week of rehearsals and artistic director Nicholas Hytner took over as director). He has also played opposite Lesley Manville in the premier of Rebecca Lenkiewicz’s play, Her Naked Skin (directed by Howard Davis) and Fiona Shaw in Deborah Warner's production of Mother Courage and Her Children.

Monaco has performed at various other theatres around the country, notable at the Finborough Theatre where he played opposite Victor Spinetti in a two-hander production of Albert's Boy by James Graham. His television work includes roles in As If, Eastenders, The Bill, Holby City, Rome, The Passion, Ashes to Ashes, Any Human Heart and Episodes.

In 2007, Monaco was nominated for the BBC New Talent New Filmmaker Award for his short film The Crusader, which he wrote and directed.

Filmography

References 

Living people
Year of birth missing (living people)
Alumni of RADA
British male film actors
British male stage actors
British male television actors
21st-century British male actors